Minjinia turgenensis is a species of placoderm from the Devonian of Mongolia. It is known from a single specimen preserving part of the skull, including remains of endochondral bone, which indicates that a mineralised endoskeleton evolved before the split between bony and cartilaginous fish, and that it was lost in the latter group.

Classification
In the phylogenetic analysis ran by Brazeau et al., M. turgenensis was found as the sister taxon of a clade formed by Entelognathus, Ramirosuarezia, Janusiscus and the crown gnathostomes. A cladogram simplified from their analysis is shown below:

References

Placoderm genera
Fossil taxa described in 2020
Placoderms